Charles Hurditch (1 February 1869 – 24 January 1917) was a Jamaican cricketer. He played in three first-class matches for the Jamaican cricket team between 1894 and 1917.

See also
 List of Jamaican representative cricketers

References

External links
 

1869 births
1917 deaths
Jamaican cricketers
Jamaica cricketers
People from Hampstead
Europeans cricketers